Thamer is a given name, and its variant is Thamir. Notable people with the name include:

Given name
Thamer Kamal Ali (born 1988), Qatari middle-distance runner 
Thamer Nayef al-Hathal (born 1973), Iraqi politician
Thamer Yousif, Iraqi and ethnic Assyrian football player

Thamir
Thamir Ghadhban (born 1945), Iraqi politician
Thamir Muhsin (1938–1995), Iraqi football manager
Thamir bin Abdulaziz Al Saud (1937–1958), Saudi royal

Middle name
Hamad bin Thamer Al Thani, Qatari royal and businessman